.bd is the Internet country code top-level domain (ccTLD) for Bangladesh. It is administered by the Ministry of Posts, Telecommunications and Information Technology.  Registrations are at the third level beneath several second-level labels, paralleling the oldest gTLDs; registration is open except in the gov and mil subdomains, which are limited to authorized entities in the Bangladesh government. Though online registration available, currently BTCL only allowing Second-level domain registration of .bd domain for only Bangladeshi citizens. Means, It only allows the structure of websites like - example.com.bd, example2.com.bd. example3.com.bd; but not like - example.bd, example2.bd, example3.bd.

.বাংলা ("Bangla") is a second country code top-level domain that was granted to Bangladesh in 2011. This domain is meant for web addresses in the Bengali language.

Though .bd domain was introduced on 20 May 1999, the Bangladesh Telecommunications Company Limited (BTCL) started registering for generals in 2003. Similarly, .বাংলা domain was introduced in 2011, the BTCL started the process of assigning domain names for websites on 1 January 2017.

Top-Level domain
 .bd
 .বাংলা

Second-Level domain

See also
 Internet in Bangladesh
 Telecommunications in Bangladesh

References

External links
 IANA .bd whois information
 .bd whois service

Communications in Bangladesh
Country code top-level domains
Internet in Bangladesh